Telun Berasap Falls is a waterfall found in Kerinci Regency, Jambi province, Indonesia. The source of water is Telun river, which disgorges around Mount Seven. The immediate source of water is Mount Seven Falls, which flows from Lake Gunung Tujuh atop Mount Seven.

References

Waterfalls of Indonesia
Landforms of Jambi
Landforms of Sumatra